Vidim may refer to:
Vidim (Mělník District), a municipality and village in the Czech Republic
Vidim, Russia, an urban-type settlement in Irkutsk Oblast, Russia